HMS Cumberland was a three-deck 80-gun third rate ship of the line of the Royal Navy, built by Joseph Allin the elder at Deptford Dockyard and launched on 27 December 1710. Her design corresponded to that laid down by the 1706 Establishment of dimensions for 80-gun ships.

On 4 September 1733 she was ordered to be taken to pieces and rebuilt at Woolwich according to the 1733 proposals of the 1719 Establishment. She was relaunched on 11 July 1739. In 1747, she was reduced to a 56-gun ship.

Cumberland sank while anchored off the Indian port of Goa on the night of 2 November 1760. Her captain, Robert Kirk, faced a court martial for the loss of his ship, but was acquitted. The court found that Cumberlands sinking "proceeded from her being entirely decayed, and not in a condition to have proceeded to sea."

Notes

References

Ships of the line of the Royal Navy
1710s ships
Maritime incidents in 1760